Euphaedra orientalis, the orange forester, is a butterfly in the family Nymphalidae. It is found along the coast of Kenya and in eastern Tanzania, Malawi, Mozambique (from the northern coast to Beira) and eastern Zimbabwe. The habitat consists of dense forests.

Adults are attracted by fermenting bananas and ripe wild figs on the forest floor.

The larvae possibly feed on Blighia unijugata and Phoenix reclinata.

Similar species
Other members of the Euphaedra eleus species group q.v.

References

Butterflies described in 1898
orientalis
Butterflies of Africa
Taxa named by Walter Rothschild